Fort Capuzzo  was a fort in the colony of Italian Libya, near the Libyan-Egyptian border, next to the Italian Frontier Wire. The fort was built during Italian colonial repression of Senussi resistance in the Second Italo-Senussi War (1923–1931), as part of a barrier on the Libya-Egypt and Libya-Sudan borders.

The Frontier Wire and a series of forts including Fort Capuzzo, were used to stop the Senussi from moving freely across the border. The fort had four crenellated walls enclosing a yard. Living quarters had been built around the edges and provided the base for border guards and Italian army armoured car patrols. A track ran south from the fort, just west of the frontier wire and the border, to Sidi Omar, Fort Maddalena and Giarabub. The fort changed hands several times during the Western Desert Campaign (1940–1943) of the Second World War.

Background

The frontier wire and fort system was used to hinder the movement of Senussi fighters and materials from Egypt. Three large forts at Amseat (Fort Capuzzo), Scegga (Fort Maddalena) and Giarabub and six smaller ones at El Ramleh on the gulf of Sollum, at Sidi Omar, Sceferzen, Vescechet, Garn ul Grein and El Aamara along the wire. The wire was patrolled using armoured cars and aircraft from the forts, by the Italian army and border guards, who attacked anyone seen in the frontier zone.

Second World War

1940

On 14 June 1940, four days after the Italian declaration of war on Britain, the 7th Hussars and elements of the 1st Royal Tank Regiment, Gladiators of 33 Squadron Royal Air Force (RAF) and Blenheims of 211 Squadron captured Fort Capuzzo; the 11th Hussars took Fort Maddalena about  further south. The fort was not occupied long for lack of troops and equipment but demolition parties visited each night to destroy Italian ammunition and vehicles. For the rest of June, the British patrolled to the north, south and west and began the Siege of Giarabub. The Italian 10th Army concentrated in the area from Bardia to Tobruk and brought forward the Maletti Group, a combined tank, infantry and artillery force, equipped with a company of Fiat M11/39 medium tanks, which were superior to their older L3/33 tankettes.

The Italians reoccupied Fort Capuzzo and held it with part of the 2nd CC.NN. Division "28 Ottobre" ( Francesco Argentino). On 29 June, the Maletti Group repulsed British tanks with its artillery and then defeated a night attack. During the frontier skirmishes from 11 June to 9 September, the British claimed to have inflicted  for a loss of  On 16 December, during Operation Compass (9 December 1940 – 9 February 1941) the 4th Armoured Brigade of the Western Desert Force captured Sidi Omar and the Italians withdrew from Sollum, Fort Capuzzo and the other frontier forts; Number  Supply Depot was established at the fort for the 7th Armoured Division.

1941
On 10 April, after the Axis advance from El Agheila, small British mobile columns began to harass  units around Fort Capuzzo, which was captured by the Germans on 12 April. During Operation Brevity (15–16 May) an operation to capture the area between Sollum and the fort and inflict casualties, the 22nd Guards Brigade Group and the 4th RTR was to capture the fort and then attack northwards. The operation began on 15 May and the fort was captured by the 1st Durham Light Infantry (1st DLI) and a squadron of I tanks. A counter-attack by II Battalion, Panzer Regiment 5 (with eight operational tanks) inflicted many losses and forced the 1st DLI back to Musaid. The German force advanced from Fort Capuzzo on the following afternoon.

Three Italian battalions with artillery from the 102nd Motorised Division "Trento" took over the area between Sollum, Musaid and Fort Capuzzo. Late on 15 June, the 7th Royal Tank Regiment (7th RTR) attacked Fort Capuzzo during Operation Battleaxe (15–17 June) and scattered the defenders. The British tanks broke through but infantry were slow to follow up and the tanks were not able rapidly to exploit the success. Next day, the 22nd Guards Brigade consolidated at the fort and Panzer Regiment 8 attacked near Capuzzo, only to be repulsed by the 4th Armoured Brigade. German attempts to work round the British flank failed but reduced the tank regiments in the area to  On 17 June, the danger of encirclement increased as German attacks reached Sidi Suleiman and the 22nd Guards Brigade was ordered to retreat at  The remnants of the armoured brigades covered the British withdrawal, eventually to the start line, assisted by the RAF. On 22 November, the fort was captured by the 2nd New Zealand Division, during Operation Crusader (18 November – 30 December) which then advanced on Tobruk, apart from the 5th New Zealand Brigade which remained to capture the Sollum barracks.

1942

After the Second Battle of El Alamein (23 October – 11 November 1942) Fort Capuzzo changed hands for the last time. German rearguards retired from Sidi Barrani on 9 November; next day, the 22nd Armoured Brigade advanced on Fort Capuzzo from the south and by 11 November, the last Axis troops had withdrawn from the frontier, despite orders to hold the area from Halfaya to Sollum and Sidi Omar.

Post war

After the Allied conquest in 1943, Tripolitania and Cyrenaica were ruled under the British Military Administration of Libya until Libyan independence in 1951, as a kingdom under Muhammad Idris bin Muhammad al-Mahdi as-Senussi (King Idris of Libya). Fort Capuzzo and the frontier wire disappeared into obscurity.

See also

 Frontier Wire (Libya)
 Italian Libya

Notes

Footnotes

Bibliography

Further reading

External links

 Photo of Fort Capuzzo in November 1942
 1943 Drawing by Jack Crippen
 Wikimapia
 Fort Capuzzo Desert War.net
 New Zealand soldiers at Fort Capuzzo, circa December 1941

Capuzzo
Battles involving Italy
World War II sites in Libya
Cyrenaica
Western Desert campaign
Italy–Libya relations
F